is a 2012 Japanese anime television series animated by J.C.Staff, produced by Genco and Geneon, and directed by Tatsuyuki Nagai. The screenplay was written by Yōsuke Kuroda with original character design by Taraku Uon, who both contributed in the creation of the Please! franchise (Please Teacher! and Please Twins!). The 12-episode series aired in Japan between January and March 2012 on TV Aichi and KBS. Sentai Filmworks has licensed the anime for release in North America. The staff of the anime returned to produce an original video animation episode in August 2014. A manga adaptation illustrated by Pepako Dokuta was serialized in ASCII Media Works' Dengeki Daioh magazine.

Characters

Main characters

The male protagonist is a student in his first year of high school. He is an avid videographer and constantly out recording on an 8mm handheld camera that he inherited from his late grandfather; his parents have also died, so he uses film to create memories of people that will persist after their deaths. Others sometimes refer to him as "The Director", though he does not mind delegating creative control to Remon. Ever since meeting Ichika, he is attracted to her, avoiding the attentions of Kanna or Kaori. Even though she is an alien, Kaito accepts Ichika, and they later become a couple. Before Ichika left to go back to her planet, he promised to love her forever. It is shown that before Kaito and his friends graduated from high school, they completed the film, adding a scene that reveals that Ichika was able to return to Earth again.

The female protagonist is an alien whose ship accidentally crash-lands on Earth, injuring Kaito. She saves him by transferring the medical treatment nanomachines in her cells through kissing and remains with him initially in order to be certain that he is in good condition. She transfers into Kaito's high school and becomes a third-year student in the same class as Remon Yamano, who becomes her best friend. She is kind, polite, and friendly, eagerly taking up domestic duties in the Kirishima household. Being an alien unaccustomed to life on Earth, Ichika sometimes acts weird in the eyes of others (such as cooking bizarre, yet still edible combinations of food). When people question her actions, she fears that they will realize she is an alien and report her to the Men in Black, so she initially avoids serious conversations about the past or Kaito's feelings. Ichika eventually revealed to the group that she is an alien, but it didn't bother them at all, especially Kaito who subconsciously suspected her identity due to their first meeting. Influenced by Kanna's insistence that she was making excuses to not seize happiness, Ichika confessed to Kaito and began dating him. Ichika said that she would continue loving Kaito, even after she left the planet. At the end of the series, Ichika is shown in the final scene of the completed film, revealing that she was able to return to Earth again.

An outgoing girl who is quick to speak her mind. Ever since they met in middle school, she has been a close friend of Kaito, whom she has a crush on. Kaito's sister is aware of this and encourages a relationship between the two. Under the influence of drinks, Kanna becomes flirtatious, much to her embarrassment. In a running gag, whenever she wears cute clothes, Ichika wears the same kind of clothing and looks better than her. Kanna told Ichika that they both like Kaito while Kaito only likes Ichika, so being an alien is no excuse for Ichika to not be happy with him. Afterwards she was depressed for a while; then she got over it and confessed her love to Kaito and accepted his rejection with a smile. Kanna has been friends with Tetsuro since childhood; she does not return his feelings for her.

A close friend of Kaito. He has been friends with Kanna since childhood and encourages her to confess to Kaito. At the same time, he invited Ichika to help make the movie, actually hoping that Kaito would end up with Ichika, so Kanna would be available for Tetsuro. He later confessed to Kanna and knew she would reject it; he just wanted to not regret saying it. Tetsuro is handsome and has a way with women, a knack for memorizing their names and faces. He also develops a closer relationship with Mio after supporting her through her problems and learning about her crush on him. During the final battle, Tetsuro asks Mio on a date to the movies.

A good friend of Kanna. She is initially a shy girl with long hair, innocently ending up in sexual situations. However, she is withdrawn mostly because she is embarrassed by the unusual lifestyle of her family: nudism. She only came to understand normal society in middle school when she met Kanna and Tetsuro, who brought her out of her shell. After revealing her lifestyle and confessing to Tetsuro, Mio cuts her hair short, and Tetsuro acknowledges her as a strong person. Observant and selfless, she continues to comfort him even after he did not accept her feelings.

A third-year high school student with a petite appearance and a distinctive laugh of "ufufu". She does not seek out other people until Ichika transfers into her class. The two girls become best friends and join the film creation project. Remon is mischievous: she proposes lewd dares in the king's game and serves alcoholic drinks. Since she claims to have written a script for Lucas in Hollywood, she ends up being the writer for the group's film, where she makes Ichika's character an alien. Manami brings her age into question, and Remon says she is "forever seventeen". When Ichika does reveal that she is an alien, Remon is extremely prepared for the resulting battles. The final episode reveals that Remon is an agent of the Men in Black.

Other characters

A companion to Ichika, this alien lifeform is nonhumanoid, stands roughly 12 inches tall, and is the organic computer interface for Ichika's spaceship. It is also able to teleport Ichika, operate support machinery, and aid her in healing Kaito when necessary. After Ichika has been brought back to her home planet, Rinon remains on Earth and stays with Remon at the Men in Black agency. However, when Ichika comes back again, Rinon is seen on her shoulder.

Kaito's big sister. She dotes on Kaito ever since their parents' death and is easily moved to tears. She trusts Ichika to take care of Kaito when she goes on a business trip to Bolivia and leaves the two alone in their house.

Tetsuro's older sister. She is married to Satoshi Ogura, but frequently quarrels with him (usually due to the simplest things) and stays over at Tetsuro's apartment to cool down. Her husband was revealed to be part of the Men in Black agency in the last episode.

Kaito's elementary classmate. She sat next to Kaito in elementary school. She calls Kaito  Umi-chan .

Kaori's friend. She is obsessed with Tetsuro which makes Mio jealous. She is also aggressive and strong, with stamina to match.

Ichika's sister. She comes to Earth to bring her sister home, but seeing her love for Kaito, she decided to offer assistance to fulfill her wish with Remon's help.

Media

Anime
The Waiting in the Summer anime television series directed by Tatsuyuki Nagai and produced by J.C.Staff and Genco began airing in Japan on January 10, 2012 on the TV Aichi and KBS television networks. The screenplay was written by Yōsuke Kuroda, who originally conceived the series with original character designer Taraku Uon. Masayoshi Tanaka based the character design used in the anime on Uon's concepts. The music was mainly produced by Maiko Iuchi, with other members of I've Sound, and the sound director is Jin Aketagawa. The opening theme is "Sign" sung by Ray, featuring lyrics written by Kotoko and composed by Shinji Orito of Key. The ending theme is  sung by Nagi Yanagi, who also wrote the lyrics, and is composed by Tomoyuki Nakazawa of I've Sound. The single for "Sign" was released on February 8, 2012, and the single for "Vidro Moyō" was released on February 29, 2012. Sentai Filmworks has licensed the anime for release in North America, and Crunchyroll is streaming the series in North and South America. Madman Entertainment licensed the series for release in Australia and New Zealand. The staff of the anime returned to produce an original video animation episode released with the Blu-ray box set on August 29, 2014. Sentai Filmworks re-released the series with an English dub on August 20, 2019.

Internet radio show
An internet radio show to promote Waiting in the Summer called  had a pre-broadcast on December 26, 2011. It ran for 12 weekly broadcasts between January 16 and April 30, 2012. Produced by Hibiki Radio Station, the show was hosted by Haruka Tomatsu (the voice of Ichika Takatsuki) and Rina Hidaka (the voice of Rinon).

Print
A manga adaptation illustrated by Pepako Dokuta was serialized between the March 2012 and February 2013 issues of ASCII Media Works' Dengeki Daioh magazine. ASCII Media Works released three tankōbon volumes from March 27, 2012 to February 27, 2013. Media Factory published two light novels, written by Ichika Toyogawa with illustrations by Taraku Uon: the first on March 22, 2012 and the second on July 23, 2012. An art book titled  was published by Mitsumura Suiko Shoin on July 18, 2012.

See also
Please Teacher!
Please Twins!

References

External links
  
 

2012 anime television series debuts
2012 manga
Anime with original screenplays
ASCII Media Works manga
Dengeki Daioh
J.C.Staff
NBCUniversal Entertainment Japan
Romantic comedy anime and manga
Television shows written by Yōsuke Kuroda
Sentai Filmworks
Shōnen manga